Mark Critch (born May 14, 1974) is a Canadian comedian, actor, and writer. He is best known for his work on the comedy series This Hour Has 22 Minutes, initially as a writer and then as a regular cast member beginning in 2003.

Career 
Critch has been a guest on CBC Radio One's Madly Off in All Directions, the CBC Television show Republic of Doyle, and is the host of CBC TV's Halifax Comedy Festival. He performed at the Just For Laughs Festival in Montreal and the Winnipeg Comedy Festival. He played the recurring role of Gary Breakfast on the CTV sitcom Satisfaction. He appeared in several films, including Anchor Zone, Rare Birds and Above and Beyond. In 2013, Critch played Henry Tilley in The Grand Seduction, a remake of Jean-François Pouliot's French-Canadian La Grande Séduction (2003) directed by Don McKellar.  Critch and fellow Newfoundland actor Allan Hawco featured in a documentary entitled Trail of the Caribou, which followed the Newfoundland Regiment's journey in the First World War. It was released in 2016 to commemorate the one-hundredth anniversary of the Regiment's tragedy at Beaumont Hamel.

Critch reached national notoriety after a 22 Minutes piece aired in which Canadian Member of Parliament (MP) Carolyn Parrish stepped on a President George W. Bush doll, later causing her to be removed from caucus. He is most famous for his road pieces on the show, in which he accosted celebrities such as John Kerry, Michael Douglas, Alec Baldwin, former Canadian Prime Minister Paul Martin, Howard Dean, Avril Lavigne, Hillary Clinton and Justin Trudeau. Critch's impressions are another recurring feature on 22 Minutes, including those of Donald Trump, Rex Murphy, Don Cherry and former Newfoundland and Labrador premier Danny Williams.

Critch married long-time girlfriend Melissa Royle on August 6, 2019.

Book and adaptation 
In 2018, Critch announced the release of his early life memoir, Son of a Critch. Published by Penguin Random House Canada, it was released on October 2, 2018, and immediately entered the Globe and Mail bestseller list, where it remained for several weeks. Son of a Critch was the winner of the Margaret and John Savage First Book Award (non-fiction) at the Atlantic Book Awards, and shortlisted for both the 2019 Stephen Leacock Memorial Medal for Humour and the 2019 Kobo Emerging Writer Prize. It was also longlisted for the 2019 RBC Taylor Prize.

In 2021, CBC Television and Lionsgate Films announced the production of Son of a Critch, a television series adaptation of the book. Critch plays his father (Mike Critch) in the series, while child actor Benjamin Evan Ainsworth plays the young Critch.

Recognition 
 David Renton Award for Outstanding Performance by an Actor at the Atlantic Film Festival for his role in The Grand Seduction.
 Gemini Award
 Canadian Comedy Award
 Writers Guild of Canada Award

Charitable work 
Critch is known in Newfoundland and Labrador for his charitable efforts, including serving as honorary chair of the Victoria Park Foundation in St. John's, and the honorary fundraising patron of the O'Brien's Farm Foundation. He was named the Honorary Chairperson for the Cancer Society of Canada's "One Night Stand Against Cancer" campaign to raise funds for Nova Scotia's Sobey Cancer Support Centre. He has hosted and/or spearheaded fundraising campaigns for the Parkinson's Society of Newfoundland and Labrador and the Heart and Stroke Foundation.

On December 7, 2017, the Wonderful Grand Band released a re-recorded version of Babylon Mall for the 50th anniversary of the Avalon Mall, with Critch on vocals. Proceeds from the song remake were donated to the Tommy Sexton Centre.

References

External links 
 CBC Biographical Page
 

CBC Television people
Writers from St. John's, Newfoundland and Labrador
1974 births
Living people
This Hour Has 22 Minutes
Canadian people of Irish descent
Canadian sketch comedians
21st-century Canadian male writers
21st-century Canadian non-fiction writers
Canadian male non-fiction writers
Canadian memoirists
Male actors from Newfoundland and Labrador
21st-century memoirists
Comedians from Newfoundland and Labrador
Canadian male comedians
Canadian Comedy Award winners